Birinci Şahsevən (also, Shakhsevan, Shakhsevan Pervoye, and Shakhsevan Pervyy) is a village and the most populous municipality, except the capital Beyləqan, in the Beylagan Rayon of Azerbaijan.  It has a population of 7,345.

References 

Populated places in Beylagan District